Ord Falls is a set of rapids, usually class 2, on the Hudson River in Essex County, New York. It is located southeast of the Hamlet of Newcomb.

References

Waterfalls of New York (state)
Landforms of Essex County, New York
Tourist attractions in Essex County, New York